Mantas Knystautas (born 20 May 1994) is a Lithuanian wrestler, who competes in the men's 130 kg Greco-Roman division. He won one of the bronze medals in the 130 kg event at the 2022 World Wrestling Championships held in Belgrade, Serbia.

He has competed 2015 European Games, but lost his first fight. Knystautas started at the 2017 World championships, but lost his first fight. Same year he won bronze at the World U23 Championships.

At the 2021 European Wrestling Olympic Qualification Tournament Knystautas reached the final and qualified for 2020 Summer Olympics.

In 2022, he competed in the 130 kg event at the European Wrestling Championships in Budapest, Hungary. He won one of the bronze medals in his event at the Matteo Pellicone Ranking Series 2022 held in Rome, Italy.

References

External links 
 

Lithuanian male sport wrestlers
1994 births
Living people
Sportspeople from Vilnius
Wrestlers at the 2015 European Games
Wrestlers at the 2020 Summer Olympics
Olympic wrestlers of Lithuania
21st-century Lithuanian people